Jerzy Łoś (born 22 March 1920 in Lwów, Poland (now Lviv, Ukraine) – 1 June 1998 in Warsaw) was a Polish mathematician, logician, economist, and philosopher. He is especially known for his work in model theory, in particular for "Łoś's theorem", which states that any first-order formula is true in an ultraproduct if and only if it is true in "most" factors (see ultraproduct for details). In model theory he also proved many preservation theorems, but he gave significant contributions, as well, to foundations of mathematics, Abelian group theory and universal algebra. In the 60's he turned his attention to mathematical economics, focusing mainly on production processes and dynamic decision processes.

He was faculty at academies in Wrocław, Toruń, and Warsaw.

In 1996, Łoś suffered from a severe brain stroke. He was thenceforward ill until his death in 1998.

Selected publication

 Łoś, Jerzy (1955) Quelques remarques, théorèmes et problèmes sur les classes définissables d'algèbres.  Mathematical interpretation of formal systems, pp. 98–113. North-Holland Publishing Co., Amsterdam.

See also

External links
 Jerzy Łoś's biography

1920 births
1998 deaths
20th-century Polish mathematicians
20th-century Polish philosophers
Polish logicians
Scientists from Lviv